Monilaria is a genus of plants in the family Aizoaceae.

List of species

 Monilaria brevifolia L.Bolus
 Monilaria chrysoleuca Schwantes
 Monilaria globosa (L.Bolus) L.Bolus
 Monilaria luckhoffii L.Bolus
 Monilaria microstigma L.Bolus
 Monilaria moniliformis (Thunb.) Ihlenf. & S.Jörg.
 Monilaria obconica Ihlenf. & S.Jörg.
 Monilaria peersii L.Bolus
 Monilaria pisiformis Schwantes
 Monilaria polita L.Bolus
 Monilaria primosii L.Bolus
 Monilaria ramulosa (L.Bolus) L.Bolus
 Monilaria salmonea L.Bolus
 Monilaria scutata Schwantes
 Monilaria vestita Schwantes
 Monilaria watermeyeri (L.Bolus) Schwantes

References

Aizoaceae
Aizoaceae genera